Michael Hess (born May 17, 1955) is an American rower. He competed in the men's eight event at the 1976 Summer Olympics.

References

1955 births
Living people
American male rowers
Olympic rowers of the United States
Rowers at the 1976 Summer Olympics
Sportspeople from Chillicothe, Ohio
Pan American Games medalists in rowing
Pan American Games gold medalists for the United States
Rowers at the 1975 Pan American Games
Rowers at the 1979 Pan American Games